Walnut Valley is a region in the eastern San Gabriel Valley of Southern California. This area is known for its rolling hills.

The valley is noted for its fairly recent influx of Asian Americans into its upper-class residential neighborhoods. Walnut now has an Asian American majority, with Diamond Bar about half Asian and half White.

Cities
 Diamond Bar
 Portions of Industry
 Walnut

Geography of Southern California